Mezzoforte is an instrumental jazz-funk fusion band from Iceland, formed in 1977.

They signed a record deal with Icelandic label Steinar. Their biggest hit single was "Garden Party" (1983), taken from their fourth album (second international release) Surprise Surprise. It peaked at number 17 in the UK Singles Chart. The solo that takes place two minutes into "Garden Party", was created and played on the flugelhorn by English trumpeter, Stephen Dawson. "Garden Party" was later covered by Herb Alpert, at a slower speed than the original, apparently as he had learned the track from the single played at the wrong speed. Another single, "Rockall" spent one week at number 75 in the same listing in June that year, and was used as a signature tune by several European radio chart shows.

The band was named after the traditional musical term mezzo forte, an instruction to play literally "moderately loud".

Band members
Original line-up from 1977:

 Eyþór Gunnarsson – keyboards
 Jóhann Ásmundsson – bass
 Gunnlaugur Briem-Gulli Briem (Gulli) – drums
 Friðrik Karlsson (Frissi) – guitars

Other members, present and past:

 Bruno Müller – guitars (2005–present)
 Sebastian Studnitzky – trumpet & keyboards (2005–present)
 Thomas Dyani – percussion (2004–present)
 Jonas Wall – saxophones (2013–present)
 Ari Bragi Karason – trumpet
 Staffan William-Olsson – guitars (2003–2004)
 Joel Palsson – saxophones (2003)
 Guðmundur Pétursson – guitars (2003)
 Óskar Guðjónsson – saxophones (1996–2003, 2005–2013)
 Kåre Kolve – saxophones (1991–1994)
 Björn Thorarensen – synthesizers (1980–1982)
 Kristinn Svavarsson – saxophones (1982–1985)
 David O'Higgins – saxophones (1985–1989, 2002–2004)
 Jeroen De Rijk – percussion (1984–1986)

Discography

Albums

Studio albums

Live albums

Compilation albums

Video albums

Singles

References

External links

 mezzoforte.com  (official site)
 
 
 gullibriem.com  (Gulli Briem's site)
 thefeelgoodcollection.com (Fridrik Karlsson's site)
 bruno-mueller-music.de (Bruno Müller's site)
 studnitzky.de (Sebastian Studnitzky's site)
 jookraus.de (Joo Kraus' site)

Jazz fusion ensembles
Icelandic jazz ensembles
Jazz fusion saxophonists
Post-disco music groups
ZYX Music artists